Besh is a village in the former municipality of Zall-Bastar in Tirana County, Albania. At the 2015 local government reform it became part of the municipality Tirana.

Demographic history 
Besh (Bensh) is recorded in the Ottoman defter of 1467 as a village in the timar of Mustafa in the nahiyah of Benda. The settlement was small with only a total of three households represented by: Kal Sundia, Shtjafën Bozhiku, and Martin Franku.

References 

Populated places in Tirana
Villages in Tirana County